Mirranda Burton (born 1973) is a New Zealand-born artist and writer living on Wurundjeri land/Melbourne, Australia.

Burton works within the disciplines of printmaking, commercial and independent animation, illustration, graphic recording and graphic storytelling. The main focus of her art practice is linocut printmaking and writing and drawing graphic novels. Her first comic strip stories appeared from 2008 in publications such as Tango and Going Down Swinging. In 2011 her first graphic novel Hidden was published by Black Pepper Publishing, for which she received an Aurealis Award and a Gold Ledger for excellence in Australian comics. Hidden was also published under the title Cachés by La Boîte à Bulles. In 2021 her second graphic novel Underground: Marsupial Outlaws and Other Rebels of Australia’s War in Vietnam was published by Allen & Unwin.

Burton was Illustrator-in-Residence at The Atrium, Federation Square during the Melbourne Writers Festival in 2012  and artist in residence at the Dunmoochin Foundation, 2011 to 2013.

Awards 
Aurealis Award for graphic novel (2011)
Golden Ledger award for excellence in Australian comics (2012)

Publications 

 Hidden (2011)
 Three Words: An anthology of Aotearoa / NZ Women's Comics (2016) (contributor)
 ''Underground: Marsupial Outlaws and Other Rebels of Australia's War in Vietnam" (2021), Allen & Unwin

References

Australian comics artists
Australian women artists
Australian artists
Australian printmakers
Living people
21st-century New Zealand women artists
New Zealand printmakers
1973 births
21st-century New Zealand women writers
New Zealand female comics artists
New Zealand comics artists